Hidden Figures: The True Story of Four Black Women and the Space Race is a 2018 picture book by Margot Lee Shetterly with Winifred Conkling, illustrated by Laura Freeman. The picture book is adapted from Shetterly's 2016 non-fiction book Hidden Figures: The American Dream and the Untold Story of the Black Women Who Helped Win the Space Race. In 2019, it was spawned into a 15-minute animated film, narrated  by Octavia Spencer and released by Weston Woods Studios.

Summary 
Hidden Figures tells the story of four African-American women mathematicians and the work they did at NASA from the 1940s to the 1960s.

Reception 
Kirkus Reviews called the Hidden Figures "an important story to tell about four heroines." Writing for School Library Journal, Megan Kilgallen said "Freeman’s full-color illustrations are stunning and chock-full of details, incorporating diagrams, mathematical formulas, and space motifs throughout . . . enhancing the whole book."

Hidden Figures was named a Coretta Scott King Award honor book for illustration.

See also

 Hidden Figures, 2016 film

References 

2018 children's books
American picture books
Books about African-American history
Books about the Cold War
Books about women
Children's history books
Literature by African-American women